Tõnu Mellik (12 May 1934 Tartu – 3 June 1993 Tallinn) was an award-winning Estonian architect active in the mid-twentieth century.

Early life

Tõnu Mellik graduated from Tallinn Secondary School in 1952. He went on to study film direction at the Moscow State All-Union Institute of Cinematography. In 1953 he went on to study at the State Art Institute of the Estonian SSR (ERKI) and ultimately graduated in 1959. After graduation he worked in Tallinn from 1959 to 1962 and became a member of the Union of Architects in 1960. From 1964 to 1968 he worked as a senior engineer and junior researcher at the Institute of Building and Building Materials. Thereafter, he worked as an architect for the "Estonian Land Reconstruction Project" until 1975. From 1975 to 1987, he was a senior lecturer at ERKI. In 1981, he was the chief architect of the private company, "Esmar".

Family

Mellik was the son of sculptor Voldemar Mellik and Linda Mellik, and brother of architect Ants Mellik.

Creations

Tõnu Mellik designed industrial, commercial, and residential buildings. He assisted in the development of the towns of Kiili, Kohila, Kuusalu, Loksa, Taebla, Viru-Jaagupi, Haabneeme, and Padise.

Mellik participated in developing the Tallinn General Plan and in the reconstruction of the city center in 1968. Arguably the most impressive building he worked on is the Otepää ski base, built in 1978.

Soviet-era architects like Tõnu Mellik were, by convention, simple practitioners. Soviet strictures did not permit architects to freely create their own works by exercising their own vision.

More Tõnu Mellik Buildings:
 Männiku experimental base of the Estonian Academy of Sciences (1962)
 The "Volta" factory technical building (1965)
 "Ühistare" cooperative house (1966)
 Keila-Joal Sanatorium Boarding School training building (1976)
 Three-story twelve-apartment terraced apartment building (1979)
 Tamsalu Culture House (1980)
 Viimsi office building (1991)

Awards won 
 In 1958 Ants and Tõnu Mellik won the first and second prizes for the Mustamäe residential area plan.
 In 1971 Mellik won first prize for the Saha-Loo area plan and buildings.
 In 1972, together with Peep Jänse, he won the first and second prizes for the opera and ballet theatre at Tõnismägi in Tallinn.
 In 1976 he won first prize for the Pajusi Collective Farm.
 In 1977, working with Peep Jänse, he won first prize for Elva's Retirement Home.
 In 1978 he won the first prize for Tartu Designers' House.

External links 
 Padise Koidula collective farms terraced houses, https://www.muis.ee/museaalview/2628716
 Otepaa ski base, https://www.muis.ee/museaalview/2634897
 Kiili in the 1970s, http://entsyklopeedia.ee/galerii/kiili_vald
 Keila-Joa sanatorium school, https://www.e-varamu.ee/item/ZN26PR4F7ZDVT7ZEHCCURQJ625TISNL3
 Apartment buildings in Padisel, https://www.muis.ee/museaalview/2636777
 The exhibition "Estonian Architecture" at the Tallinn Art Hall, prepared by Arvo Niineväli, Tõnu Mellik, and Peep Jänes in 1972., https://kultuur.postimees.ee/3081275/galerii-ja-intervjuu-peep-janesega-modernisti-loometee
 Tamsalu cultural house, https://kultuur.postimees.ee/3081275/galerii-ja-intervjuu-peep-janesega-modernisti-loometee

References 

1934 births
1993 deaths
 Architects from Tallinn